Bob Lavoy (June 29, 1926 – December 18, 2010) was an American professional basketball player and coach. Lavoy played for three years at Western Kentucky University before a short stint in the National Basketball Association. Lavoy spent most of his time in the NBA with the Indianapolis Olympians but also played a season with the Syracuse Nationals. He also coached at the University of Tampa for eight years.

College career
Lavoy played his college ball at Western Kentucky University and led the Hilltoppers to a 78–12 record during his three years in Bowling Green. He helped Western Kentucky capture a Kentucky Intercollegiate Conference title and two Ohio Valley Conference championships. Lavoy and the Hilltoppers played in the National Invitational Tournament three years in a row. The closest the Hilltoppers came to winning the NIT was in 1948 when the Hilltoppers fell in the semifinals to Saint Louis University 60–53. Saint Louis was led by future Basketball Hall of Famer Ed Macauley.

Lavoy was inducted into the Western Kentucky Athletic Hall of Fame, the Illinois Athletic Hall of Fame and the East Aurora High School.

Professional career
Lavoy was drafted by the Indianapolis Olympians with the 9th overall pick in the 1950 NBA draft. Lavoy started for the Olympians for three seasons and was 10th in the league in field goal percentage in 1952 and 9th in 1953. The Olympians folded after the 1952–53 season and Lavoy was selected by the Milwaukee Hawks in the dispersal draft. He never played a game for the Hawks though, and was traded to the Syracuse Nationals for Noble Jorgensen. Lavoy only played one season in Syracuse and in that season, the Nationals lost in the 1954 NBA Finals to the Minneapolis Lakers in seven games. During his four-year career in the NBA, Lavoy averaged 27 minutes a game, 8.2 points a game (.384 FG%, .707 FT%), 6.2 rebounds a game and 1.5 assists a game.

References

External links

1926 births
2010 deaths
All-American college men's basketball players
American men's basketball players
Basketball coaches from Illinois
Basketball players from Illinois
Centers (basketball)
College men's basketball head coaches in the United States
Indianapolis Olympians draft picks
Indianapolis Olympians players
Milwaukee Hawks players
Power forwards (basketball)
Sportspeople from Aurora, Illinois
Syracuse Nationals players
Tampa Spartans men's basketball coaches
Western Kentucky Hilltoppers basketball players